The 1975–76 National Hurling League was the 45th season of the National Hurling League.

Division 1

Galway came into the season as defending champions of the 1974-75 season. Westmeath entered Division 1 as the promoted team.

On 20 June 1976, Kilkenny won the title after a 6-14 to 1-14 win over Clare in the final. It was their 4th league title overall and their first since 1965-66.

Westmeath were relegated from Division 1 after just one season in the top flight. They were defeated by Antrim in a relegation play-off.

Kilkenny's Eddie Keher was the Division 1 top scorer with 11-58.

Structure

The 14 teams in Division 1 were divided into two groups of seven teams named Division 1A and Division 1B. Each team played all the others in its group once. Two points were awarded for a win and one for a draw. The first two teams in Division 1A advanced to the league semi-finals. The third and fourth-placed teams in Division 1A joined the first two teams in Division 1B in the quarter-finals. The bottom-placed team in Division 1A was relegated to Division 1B with the Division 1B champion gaining promotion. The bottom-placed team in Division 1B was relegated to Division 2.

Division 1A table

Group stage

Division 1B table

Group stage

Play-off

Knock-out stage

Quarter-finals

Semi-finals

Finals

Scoring statistics

Top scorers overall

Top scorers in a single game

Division 2

On 7 March 1976, Wicklow won the title after a 2-9 to 0-7 win over Down in a play-off.

Division 2 table

Group stage

Play-off

References

National Hurling League seasons
League
League